Chemistry (styled as CHEMISTRY) is a Japanese pop duo, consisting of  and .

History 
They were the winners of the Asayan audition (similar to the American Idol series) in 2000 organized by Sony Music Entertainment Japan.

Their first single "Pieces of a Dream" was released on March 3, 2001, and was the best selling single that year (over 2 million). Most of their singles have reached #1 on the Oricon charts; all five albums have reached #1 the day they were released. Their #1 streak was broken by the KinKi Kids' album H Album: Hand, scoring them a #2 rank for Fo(u)r.

Chemistry is also known in Korea for the popular collaboration song "Let's Get Together Now," featuring talents from both Korea and Japan and for collaborating with Korean singer Lena Park who appears in the B-side "Dance with Me" on the "Kimi ga Iru" single.

On March 6, 2008, Kaname Kawabata married model Miki Takahashi. They met after she appeared in the PV for "This Night."

Their single "Period" was selected as the fourth opening for the anime series Fullmetal Alchemist: Brotherhood.

In 2010, Chemistry worked together with the 4-person dance group Synergy to release "Shawty". Another joint work of the two groups was released November 3, 2010, titled "Keep Your Love".

In 2011, Chemistry was tapped by Bandai Visual to record a song for the OVA series, Mobile Suit Gundam Unicorn, due to be the title song for the 3rd episode, "The Ghost of Laplace". "Merry-go-round" is due for release on March 2, 2011, as a follow up before the OVA's actual release on March 5, 2011.

Their 15th single "Wings of Words" was used as the fourth opening theme for Mobile Suit Gundam SEED Destiny from PHASE-38 to 49.  Chemistry performed this song live in collaboration with the two-time Olympic champion in figure skating, Yuzuru Hanyu, at the 2018 Fantasy on Ice in Makuhari and Kanazawa. Kawabata made a solo appearance in the 2016 edition of the ice show as well.

After going on hiatus in 2012 so that both members could focus on pursuing solo careers, the pair resumed activities as a musical duo in 2017. Their new single "Windy" was used as the second ending theme song for the anime adaptation of Altair: A Record of Battles.

Discography

Albums

Singles

Videos

References

External links

  
  at Sony Music Japan  
  at Sony Music Japan  
 

Defstar Records artists
Japanese musical duos
Japanese pop music groups
Musical groups from Tokyo
Male musical duos
Japanese boy bands
Fantasy on Ice guest artists